Forest Fair Village (formerly Cincinnati Mall, Cincinnati Mills, and Forest Fair Mall) was a shopping mall in the northern suburbs of Cincinnati, Ohio, United States. It is situated on the border between Forest Park and Fairfield, at the junction of Interstate 275 and Winton Road (Exit 39). The mall, built in phases between 1988 and 1989 as Forest Fair Mall, has become noted for its troubled history; despite being the second-biggest mall in the state and bringing many new retailers to the market, it lost three anchor stores (B. Altman and Company, Bonwit Teller, and Sakowitz) and its original owner LJ Hooker to bankruptcy less than a year after opening. The mall underwent renovations throughout the mid 1990s, attracting new stores such as Kohl's, Burlington Coat Factory, and Bass Pro Shops. Mills Corporation renamed the property to Cincinnati Mills in 2002 and renovated the mall once more in August 2004. Following the sale of Mills's portfolio to Simon Property Group, the mall was sold several times afterward, while continuing to lose many of its key tenants. After having been renamed to Cincinnati Mall and again to Forest Fair Village in the 2010s, the property received significant media attention as an example of a dead mall. It also received a number of proposals for renovation, none of which were realized. Following years of tenancy decline, it closed to the public on December 2, 2022.

History

Initially, the site at the northeast corner of the Interstate 275 beltway's interchange with Winton Road was to consist solely of Bigg's, a local hypermarket chain. Australian retail developer LJ Hooker acquired the property from original developer Amega in 1986 and chose to make Bigg's an anchor store to a large enclosed shopping mall, which would be named Forest Fair Mall. By July 1987, mall developers had also stated that two other department stores had committed to the project: Higbee's and Bonwit Teller. Overall, Forest Fair Mall would be the second-biggest mall in the state of Ohio at the time of construction, behind only the now-defunct Randall Park Mall in North Randall, a suburb of Cleveland. Also in 1987, Hooker bought controlling interest in both Bonwit Teller and three other department stores: B. Altman and Company, Parisian, and Sakowitz. B. Altman was confirmed as a tenant in November 1987 and Parisian in March 1988, while negotiations with Sakowitz began in October 1988.

19881990: Opening and early years
The first phase of the mall, featuring Bigg's and approximately 20 other stores, opened on July 11, 1988. A month prior to this, Higbee's withdrew from the project after being purchased by a joint venture of Dillard's and Edward J. DeBartolo Sr. As a result, B. Altman was relocated from its originally planned store to the space vacated by Higbee's, thus leaving a vacant anchor store and causing delays in opening the rest of the mall. Immediately after the Bigg's wing of the mall opened, Elder-Beerman was confirmed for the vacated anchor left behind by B. Altman's relocation. As a result, the rest of the mall's opening was delayed to October 1988, and again to March 1, 1989. About one-third of the mall tenants were open by this day, including Bonwit Teller, B. Altman, Parisian, and the food court. By mid-year, Elder-Beerman and Sakowitz had also opened. Other tenants included an Australian restaurant called Wallaby Bob's, a 1950s-styled cafe, Oshman's Sporting Goods, and an eight-screen movie theater called Super Saver. Many of the tenants were unique at the time: Wallaby Bob's was "the first brewery-restaurant in the nation that operates in a suburban shopping mall", while another tenant, Koala Klubhouse, was the first licensed day care to be located in an American shopping mall. Another major tenant present at opening day was a  entertainment complex called Time Out, featuring a carousel and miniature golf course. A 1989 article in The Cincinnati Enquirer described the mall as "entering uncharted waters" due to Sakowitz, B. Altman, Parisian, and Bonwit Teller all being not only new to the Cincinnati market, but also due to the higher-priced merchandise available at those stores, in comparison to the area's more blue collar demographics.

LJ Hooker filed for bankruptcy soon after the mall opened due to debt accrued by the company's expansion in the United States. The company put Forest Fair up for sale in June 1989, with an asking price of $200 million. At this point, only 65 percent of the inline mall space was occupied, and the mall was described as "struggling" due to the large number of vacancies, primarily in the B. Altman wing. The proximity to both Northgate Mall and Tri-County Mall was also cited as a factor in the mall's struggles, particularly due to the latter undergoing an expansion not long after Forest Fair opened. Despite the mall's troubles, the owners of Parisian noted that the store's sales were strong enough for the company to consider expansion in the Cincinnati market. As part of LJ Hooker's bankruptcy filing, the company offered all four of the department stores it had acquired for sale. Parisian was sold back to its previous ownership, while the other three department stores were ordered to undergo liquidation. The other six B. Altman stores began liquidation in November 1989, although the Forest Fair store was kept open at the time, due to concerns by LJ Hooker's lawyers that closing the store would lower the mall's value. Liquidation sales began in August 1990 at Forest Fair's locations of all three department stores. All of the other Sakowitz stores were also liquidated at this point, along with all but two locations of Bonwit Teller. These locations, both in Upstate New York, were sold to The Pyramid Companies. In October 1990, the mall was sold to a partnership called FFM Limited, headed by a group of banks which had loaned to LJ Hooker most of the $250 million in construction costs.

1990s: The Shops at Forest Fair and redevelopment
In 1992, the owners announced a new concept for the mall, known as The Shops at Forest Fair. Under this concept, each wing would focus on a different theme of shopping. The southwestern wing featuring Parisian and Elder-Beerman became "The Fashions at Forest Fair", featuring apparel and traditional department stores. Formerly home to B. Altman, the northwestern wing became "The Lifestyles at Forest Fair", with stores focused on home decor, entertainment, and sporting goods. Surrounding Bigg's, the eastern wing became "The Markets at Forest Fair", which featured tenants centered on "value, services, and convenience". Finally, center court and the former location of Bonwit Teller became "The Festival at Forest Fair", focused on entertainment and new restaurants. Also, Lexington, Kentucky-based clothing store Dawahares opened its first Ohio store in the vacated Sakowitz space, while Subway and Hot Dog on a Stick joined the food court. By June 1993, further new tenants had opened, including a Sam Goody/Suncoast Motion Picture Company music and video superstore in the Lifestyle wing and a CompUSA electronics store in the Markets wing. At the time, each of the other wings was about 90 percent leased except for the Lifestyle wing, which was only 25 percent leased. Due to the increased traffic brought on by the new stores, many new retail developments were constructed at the I-275 interchange, while the increase in businesses also boosted tax revenues in Forest Park. Although a home furnishings store called HOME had been proposed for the former B. Altman store as part of the 1992 renovations, the space ultimately remained vacant until late 1994 when Kohl's opened there. This was the first of three stores opened that year upon the chain's entry into the Cincinnati market.

The mall was put up for sale again in 1995, with FFM representatives noting that the partnership did not intend to maintain ownership for over five years. Although Phillips Edison & Company had placed a bid for the property, that company was outbid by Miami, Florida-based Gator Investments, whose purchase of the property was brokered in January 1996. In 1996, Meijer opened across the street from the mall. Several anchor stores in the mall changed under Gator's ownership: Dawahares closed in late 1996 due to poor sales, Berean Christian Stores signed a 10-year lease for a  Christian bookstore at the mall in late 1997, while Parisian closed in June 1998 and Guitar Center replaced CompUSA in August 1998 after that store moved to a larger location across from Tri-County Mall. A gym called Moore's Fitness also opened during this timespan.

In late 1999 and early 2000, Gator Investments began a second renovation plan which attracted several new tenants. Under these plans, they worked with Glimcher Realty Trust as leasing agent. The mall underwent a myriad of changes soon afterward, including three anchor stores that all opened in October 2000: Bass Pro Shops opened in the former Parisian, Burlington Coat Factory (now known as just Burlington) replaced the former "Festival" wing, and Stein Mart entered Ohio with a temporary outlet store in the space previously occupied by Dawahares. Also joining the mall between 2000 and 2001 were Media Play, Off 5th (an outlet division of Saks Fifth Avenue), and the first Steve & Barry's sports clothing store in Ohio. These stores were part of a reconceptualization of the mall as "a value retail center with new-to-the-market merchants". Furthering this reconceptualization was the addition of new entertainment venues, including a nightclub called Metropolis, a new Showcase Cinemas theater complex with stadium seating, and a new children's playplace called Wonderpark.

200207: Cincinnati Mills

Mills Corporation bought the mall from Gator Investments in September 2002 and announced that the mall would undergo further redevelopment, along with a name change to Cincinnati Mills. As part of the redevelopment, Mills forced many small independent businesses out of the property. Renovations began in January, which included new paint, floors, and signage throughout, along with differently-themed decor for each wing of the mall, typical of properties developed by Mills at the time.

Elder-Beerman announced the closure of its store in 2003, as the chain wanted to focus on smaller stores in markets with lower populations. After a $70 million renovation project, the mall reopened officially as Cincinnati Mills in August 2004. As part of Mills' development, Babies "R" Us replaced Stein Mart, and Johnny's Toys had opened in the upper level of the former Elder-Beerman, while the older Super Saver theater was sold to the local theater chain Danbarry and renamed the Dollar Saver. Inline tenants at this point were focused mainly on discount stores and amenities suitable for families, as was typical of other properties developed by Mills. By January 2005, the mall had a 90 percent occupancy.

Despite these renovations, the mall's tenancy began to slump again in 2006. This included the loss of Media Play, which went out of business entirely, and Johnny's Toys, which was closed so that Steve & Barry's could create a larger store using all of the former Elder-Beerman store. In addition, the president of Bigg's reported that their store in the mall had constantly struggled in sales due to it being located at the back of the property. Also contributing to the decline were continued competition with Northgate and Tri-County malls, along with a newer outdoor mall called Bridgewater Falls in nearby Hamilton; lower-class demographics surrounding the mall; shopper unfamiliarity with the specialty tenants within; bankruptcy filings of key tenants; and complications from an accounting scandal in which the Mills corporation was involved. Simon Property Group acquired the Mills portfolio in 2007.

2008present: Cincinnati Mall, Forest Fair Village

Bigg's closed in June 2008, shortly after both Berean Christian Stores and Wonderpark closed. North Star Realty acquired the mall from Simon in January 2009. North Star proposed to begin converting portions of the mall to office space, call centers, or other non-retail uses, also renaming the property to Cincinnati Mall in April  2009. Under North Star's ownership, Steve & Barry's vacated due to the chain going out of business, while Off 5th, Guess, Lane Bryant, and Dress Barn relocated to a newly built outlet mall in Monroe. Despite the loss of these stores and other inline tenants such as MasterCuts and GNC, Totes Isotoner operated a temporary  warehouse store in a vacated retail slot near the food court. In addition, the property owners had fallen delinquent on property taxes. Cincinnati Holding Company purchased the mall in 2010, right as Showcase Cinemas closed.

Three local businessmen announced plans in 2011 to open ice skating rinks in the vacated Bigg's. By this time, Guitar Center had also closed, and a studio was proposed for its space, while a hotel was slated for the former Elder-Beerman/Steve & Barry's space. Bass Pro Shops announced plans to relocate to West Chester Township in 2013. Also, the mall was renamed again to Forest Fair Village. Burlington Coat Factory moved out of the mall in 2013, and Danbarry Dollar Saver closed in 2014. The proposed relocation of Bass Pro Shops, combined with the continued delinquent taxes, created delays in any further attempts at redevelopment. Further redevelopment plans through association with Prudential Commercial Real Estate fell through in 2014 when that company's listing agreement expired. By 2017, only Kohl's, Bass Pro Shops, an arcade, and a children's entertainment complex remained in operation. A brokerage team put the mall up for sale in 2017. In mid-2017, a Christian media company had expressed interest in using part of the mall property for a studio.

Inspectors from the city of Forest Park cited the building for a number of code violations throughout 2020, including sealed emergency exits and graffiti. At the same time, Cincinnati news station WCPO-TV began investigating the mall after viewers noted that Amazon Prime delivery trucks were using the structure's parking lot to stage deliveries. Officials of both Butler and Hamilton County submitted plans to the state of Ohio in 2022, calling for $9.5 million in funds to demolish the mall. They also began negotiations with Kohl's and Bass Pro Shops for redevelopment plans. The Butler County Journal News reported that any plans for the mall's demolition would be contingent on the availability of funds, with one potential plan being to convert the property to light industrial use.

Arcade Legacy, one of the last remaining tenants, moved out of the mall (and relocated to Sharonville, Ohio) in September 2022. A month later, WLWT reported that the mall is slated for demolition along with 825 other buildings across Ohio, as part of State Governor Mike DeWine's Ohio Building Demolition and Site Revitalization Program. The mall was finally closed on December 2, 2022 after city of Forest Park fire department closed all remaining businesses (except Bass Pro Shops and Kohl's) due to a number of fire code violations.

See also
LJ Hooker
Richland Mall (South Carolina), a defunct mall in South Carolina also developed by LJ Hooker

References

External links 
 Forest Fair Mall at DeadMalls.com

Abandoned shopping malls in the United States
Outlet malls in the United States
Defunct shopping malls in the United States
Shopping malls established in 1988
Shopping malls disestablished in 2022
Shopping malls in Hamilton County, Ohio
1988 establishments in Ohio
2022 disestablishments in Ohio
Tourist attractions in Cincinnati